Kengo Bam (born 10 September 1996) is an Indian cricketer. He made his Twenty20 debut on 8 November 2019, for Arunachal Pradesh in the 2019–20 Syed Mushtaq Ali Trophy. He made his first-class debut on 9 December 2019, for Arunachal Pradesh in the 2019–20 Ranji Trophy. He made his List A debut on 12 December 2021, for Arunachal Pradesh in the 2021–22 Vijay Hazare Trophy.

References

External links
 

1996 births
Living people
Indian cricketers
Arunachal Pradesh cricketers
Place of birth missing (living people)